The Cwm Pennant Fault is a SSW-NNE trending normal fault system in North Wales. It forms part of the structures that bound the Snowdon graben. The main faults of the Cwm Pennant fault system throw down to the east.

See also
List of geological faults of Wales

References

Geology of Wales